{{DISPLAYTITLE:2 22 honeycomb}}

In geometry, the 222 honeycomb is a uniform tessellation of the six-dimensional Euclidean space. It can be represented by the Schläfli symbol {3,3,32,2}. It is constructed from 221 facets and has a 122 vertex figure, with 54 221 polytopes around every vertex.

Its vertex arrangement is the E6 lattice, and the root system of the E6 Lie group so it can also be called the E6 honeycomb.

Construction

It is created by a Wythoff construction upon a set of 7 hyperplane mirrors in 6-dimensional space.

The facet information can be extracted from its Coxeter–Dynkin diagram, .

Removing a node on the end of one of the 2-node branches leaves the 221, its only facet type, 

The vertex figure is determined by removing the ringed node and ringing the neighboring node. This makes 122, .

The edge figure is the vertex figure of the vertex figure, here being a birectified 5-simplex, t2{34}, .

The face figure is the vertex figure of the edge figure, here being a triangular duoprism, {3}×{3}, .

Kissing number 
Each vertex of this tessellation is the center of a 5-sphere in the densest known packing in 6 dimensions, with kissing number 72, represented by the vertices of its vertex figure 122.

E6 lattice 

The 222 honeycomb's vertex arrangement is called the E6 lattice.

The E62 lattice, with [[3,3,32,2]] symmetry, can be constructed by the union of two E6 lattices:
  ∪ 

The E6* lattice (or E63) with [3[32,2,2]] symmetry. The Voronoi cell of the E6* lattice is the rectified 122 polytope, and the Voronoi tessellation is a bitruncated 222 honeycomb. It is constructed by 3 copies of the E6 lattice vertices, one from each of the three branches of the Coxeter diagram.

Geometric folding 

Related honeycombs 

The 222 honeycomb is one of 127 uniform honeycombs (39 unique) with  symmetry. 24 of them have doubled symmetry [[3,3,32,2]] with 2 equally ringed branches, and 7 have sextupled (3!) symmetry [3[32,2,2]] with identical rings on all 3 branches. There are no regular honeycombs in the family since its Coxeter diagram a nonlinear graph, but the 222 and birectified 222 are isotopic, with only one type of facet: 221, and rectified 122 polytopes respectively.

Birectified 222 honeycomb 

The birectified 222 honeycomb , has rectified 1 22 polytope facets, and a proprism {3}×{3}×{3} vertex figure.

Its facets are centered on the vertex arrangement of E6* lattice, as:
  ∪  ∪

Construction

The facet information can be extracted from its Coxeter–Dynkin diagram, .

The vertex figure is determined by removing the ringed node and ringing the neighboring node. This makes a proprism {3}×{3}×{3}, .

Removing a node on the end of one of the 3-node branches leaves the 122, its only facet type, .

Removing a second end node defines 2 types of 5-faces: birectified 5-simplex, 022 and birectified 5-orthoplex, 0211.

Removing a third end node defines 2 types of 4-faces: rectified 5-cell, 021, and 24-cell, 0111.

Removing a fourth end node defines 2 types of cells: octahedron, 011, and tetrahedron, 020.

k22 polytopes 

The 222 honeycomb, is fourth in a dimensional series of uniform polytopes, expressed by Coxeter as k22 series. The final is a paracompact hyperbolic honeycomb, 322. Each progressive uniform polytope is constructed from the previous as its vertex figure.

The 222 honeycomb is third in another dimensional series 22k.

Notes

References
 Coxeter The Beauty of Geometry: Twelve Essays, Dover Publications, 1999,  (Chapter 3: Wythoff's Construction for Uniform Polytopes)
 Coxeter Regular Polytopes (1963), Macmillan Company
 Regular Polytopes, Third edition, (1973), Dover edition,  (Chapter 5: The Kaleidoscope)
 Kaleidoscopes: Selected Writings of H.S.M. Coxeter, edited by F. Arthur Sherk, Peter McMullen, Anthony C. Thompson, Asia Ivic Weiss, Wiley-Interscience Publication, 1995,   GoogleBook
 (Paper 24) H.S.M. Coxeter, Regular and Semi-Regular Polytopes III, [Math. Zeit. 200 (1988) 3–45]
 R. T. Worley, The Voronoi Region of E6*.  J. Austral. Math. Soc. Ser. A, 43 (1987), 268-278.
 p125-126, 8.3 The 6-dimensional lattices: E6 and E6*
 
 

7-polytopes